|}

The John Bull Chase was a National Hunt Conditions chase in England which was open to horses aged five years or older. 
It was run at Wincanton over a distance of 2 miles and 5 furlongs (4,224 metres), and was scheduled to take place each year in January.

The race was last run in 2003.

Winners since 1988

 The race was won by Cavvies Clown, but he was subsequently disqualified for failing a dope test.

See also
Horseracing in Great Britain
List of British National Hunt races

References
Racing Post

Wincanton Racecourse
National Hunt races in Great Britain
National Hunt chases
Discontinued horse races